On 23 April 1979, SAETA Flight 011, a Vickers Viscount passenger aircraft of Ecuadorian airline SAETA, crashed in a mountainous region of Pastaza Province, Ecuador, killing all 57 people on board. The wreckage of the aircraft was not found until five years later.

Accident
Flight 011 departed at 7.08 am on 23 April from Quito-Mariscal Sucre Airport, Ecuador, on a domestic flight to Cuenca Airport. However, the plane disappeared from radar screens and never arrived at its destination. Search and rescue operations were quickly started, but eventually abandoned after several days without finding any trace of the plane or its occupants.

The mystery of the aircraft's disappearance gave birth to a theory published in The New York Times in November 1979, stating that the plane had been hijacked and flown to Colombia to participate in the drug smuggling to the United States. The theory was disproved when the plane wreckage was discovered on a mountain slope at a height of 5500 meter (18045 feet) in the region of Shell-Mera, Pastaza Province, in 1984. It was only then, five years after the accident, that the fate of the missing aircraft and its occupants was solved. The cause of the accident was never determined.

Aircraft
The Vickers 785D Viscount involved, HC-AVP (msn 329) was built in 1957 and was used by SAETA from 23 June 1957 until its destruction in 1979.

Aftermath
The aircraft was destroyed in the crash killing all 57 people on board. An investigation of the accident revealed that the aircraft had deviated 46 km (29 miles) from its intented course to Cuenca. However, the cause of this deviation remains unknown.

References

SAETA accidents and incidents
Airliner accidents and incidents with an unknown cause
Airliner accidents and incidents involving controlled flight into terrain
1979 in Ecuador
Aviation accidents and incidents in 1979
Accidents and incidents involving the Vickers Viscount
Aviation accidents and incidents in Ecuador
1979 disasters in Ecuador